Scott Eustace (born 13 June 1975) is an English former footballer who played in The Football League for Leicester City, Mansfield Town, Cambridge United and Lincoln City.

References

1975 births
Living people
Footballers from Leicester
Association football defenders
English footballers
Leicester City F.C. players
Mansfield Town F.C. players
Chesterfield F.C. players
Cambridge United F.C. players
Lincoln City F.C. players
Hinckley United F.C. players
Stevenage F.C. players
Telford United F.C. players
English Football League players
National League (English football) players